Miroslav Karhan (born 21 June 1976) is a Slovak football manager and former player who played as a midfielder. 

Karhan started and finished his career at Spartak Trnava; in between, he played in Spain, Turkey and Germany, where he spent ten seasons. Karhan was a regular member of the Slovakia national team and with 107 appearances, played the second most matches of any player to represent them.

Club career
Karhan began his career with local club Spartak Trnava. In 1999 he signed a four-year contract with La Liga club Real Betis, becoming the third Slovak player to join a Spanish league club in the 1990s after Peter Dubovský and Samuel Slovák. After a season he moved to Turkish side Beşiktaş, before joining German side VfL Wolfsburg in 2001. In 2002 he was named Slovak Footballer of the Year. Karhan joined Mainz 05 of the 2. Bundesliga on a free transfer from Wolfsburg in July 2007, signing a two-year contract.

He returned to Spartak Trnava in June 2011 having spent four seasons with Mainz. Karhan played for Trnava for two more seasons, taking on the role of club captain. In August 2013, he announced his retirement from playing, and that he would move to a role of sports director of Spartak Trnava.

International career
Karhan made 107 appearances for Slovakia over a period of 16 years and was the most capped Slovak footballer of all time, until his record was surpassed by Marek Hamšík in October 2018. He captained the national team. He was an ever-present part of the side during the country's qualification for the 2010 World Cup for the first time in its history, but sustained an injury and was unable to feature during the actual tournament.

Karhan is the father of two boys: Patrick, who currently plays for Spartak Trnava and represented Slovakia at youth international level, and Alex Thomas.

Career statistics

International

Scores and results list Slovakia's goal tally first, score column indicates score after each Karhan goal.

Honours
Mainz 05
 2. Bundesliga: runner-up 2008–09 (promoted)

Spartak Trnava
 Slovak Super Liga: runner-up 2011–12

Individual
 Slovak Footballer of the Year: 2002

See also
 List of men's footballers with 100 or more international caps

References

External links 
 
 
 Miroslav Karhan at RSSSF

1976 births
Living people
People from Hlohovec
Sportspeople from the Trnava Region
Association football midfielders
Slovak footballers
Slovakia international footballers
Slovak football managers
FC Spartak Trnava players
Real Betis players
Beşiktaş J.K. footballers
VfL Wolfsburg players
1. FSV Mainz 05 players
OFK Malženice players
La Liga players
Slovak Super Liga players
Bundesliga players
2. Bundesliga players
Süper Lig players
5. Liga players
4. Liga (Slovakia) players
FIFA Century Club
FC Spartak Trnava managers
Slovak Super Liga managers
ŠK Báhoň managers
3. Liga (Slovakia) managers
KFC Komárno managers
2. Liga (Slovakia) managers
Slovak expatriate footballers
Slovak expatriate sportspeople in Spain
Expatriate footballers in Spain
Slovak expatriate sportspeople in Turkey
Expatriate footballers in Turkey
Slovak expatriate sportspeople in Germany
Expatriate footballers in Germany